The Stanford Tree is the Stanford Band's mascot and the unofficial mascot of Stanford University. Stanford's team name is "Cardinal", referring to the vivid red color (not the common songbird as at several other schools), and the university does not have an official mascot. The Tree, in various versions, has been called one of America's most bizarre and controversial college mascots. The tree regularly appears at the top of Internet "worst mascot" lists but has also appeared on at least one list of top mascots.

History
The Tree is a member of the Leland Stanford Junior University Marching Band (LSJUMB) and appears at football games, basketball games, and other events where the band performs. The "Tree" is representative of El Palo Alto, the tree that appears on both the official seal of the University and the municipal seal of Palo Alto, Stanford's nearby city.

From 1930 until 1972, Stanford's sports teams had been known as the Indians, and, during the period from 1951 to 1972, Prince Lightfoot (portrayed by Timm Williams, a member of the Yurok tribe) was the official mascot. But in 1972, Native American students and staff members successfully lobbied University President Richard Lyman to abolish the "Indian" name along with what they had come to perceive as an offensive and demeaning mascot. Stanford's teams reverted unofficially to the name "Cardinal", the color that had represented the school before 1930.

From 1972 until 1981, Stanford’s official nickname was the Cardinal, but, during this time, there was debate among students and administrators concerning what the mascot and team name should be. A 1972 student referendum on the issue was in favor of restoring the Indian, while a second 1975 referendum was against. The 1975 vote included new suggestions, many alluding to the industry of the school's founder, railroad tycoon Leland Stanford: the Robber Barons, the Sequoias, the Trees, the Cardinals, the Railroaders, the Spikes, and the Huns. The Robber Barons won, but the university's administration refused to implement the vote. In 1978, 225 varsity athletes started a petition for the mascot to be the griffin, but this campaign also failed. Finally, in 1981, President Donald Kennedy declared that all Stanford athletic teams would be represented exclusively by the color cardinal.

However, in 1975, the band had performed a series of halftime shows that facetiously suggested several other new mascot candidates it considered particularly appropriate for Stanford, including the Steaming Manhole, the French Fry, and the Tree. The Tree ended up receiving so much positive attention that the band decided to make it a permanent fixture, and the Tree came to be embraced by the Stanford community at large.

The original Tree costume was conceived and constructed by Christine Hutson. When she left Stanford, she passed along the costume and the role of the Tree to a conga drum player in the band, Robert David Siegel.

In the spring of 1987, Paul Kelly wrote a column in the Stanford Daily, lamenting the lame stature of the school's mascot since it was, at that time, just kind of a big green dress. Responding to the dare, the drum major and others responded by having "Tree Tryouts" at the Shak at 2am on a Saturday morning. Kelly was the only one who showed up. They put a song on the tape while the keg flowed freely. Kelly made a fool of himself dancing. At 5am, approximately 25 band members were outside his dorm with "All I Ever.." They gave Kelly one week to prepare a costume before a men's home basketball game. Kelly spent the following summer designing and building the first true Stanford Tree complete with surf shorts and white tails (as a tribute to the drum major Jimmy Jet).

At the 1987 Big Game, Kelly was attacked by several Cal students who had run onto the field during the halftime show. Barely escaping, Kelly led them to the drum section where all three Berkeley students were tackled.

"The staffers, many still in their grounds-crew uniforms, sit in neat rows, attentive if slightly bemused. Then the trombones kick in, and the audience is blasted back in its chairs like jet pilots. Before the first song is over, a few heads are starting to bob and feet are moving to the rhythm, but all eyes are on The Band's bizarre mascot. The Tree, a nine-foot pillar of bark and foliage – with legs and a maniacal smile – looks like a character from some low rent Disneyland. He ricochets around the stage and into the audience with alarming abandon, rarely quite vertical but never entirely horizontal." – excerpt from "Band on the Run", Rolling Stone, Issue 509, Sept 24, 1987

Due to the heightened visibility of the Stanford Tree, physical altercations with Cal students became common place and part of the assignment. At the annual Battle of the Bands at UC Davis, Kelly left the Tree costume on the bus after a long day in the sun, and Cal students broke into the bus and stole the costume. The following week, the band received a ransom note offering the Tree in exchange for Oski the Bear (which had been stolen from the UCB Student Union the year before). The band did not think this trade was worth it. The tradition of building a new costume was born and every year since then, the Band and their many admirers now expect the Tree to be reinvented every fall.

With more exposure, the decision about who would become Tree became more rigorous, and the band had to adopt a more formal selection process. Today's Tree candidate must go through "grueling and humiliating physical and mental challenges" to show that he or she has sufficient chutzpah to be the Tree. During "Tree Week," candidates have been known to perform outrageous, unwise, and often dangerous stunts in order to impress the Tree selection committee, so much so that the university has felt the need to prohibit certain types of audition activities over the years.

The Tree's costume, which is created anew each year by the incumbent Tree, is a prominent target for pranksters from rival schools, in particular from Stanford's Bay Area nemesis, the University of California, Berkeley (Cal). This tendency for the Tree to come to harm at the hands of Cal fans was showcased in the run-up to the 1998 Big Game. An anonymous coterie of fraternity brothers from Cal known as the Phoenix Five stole the costume and held it "hostage" for two weeks until it was turned in to the UC Berkeley chancellor's office and returned to Stanford by the UC Police.

In 1996 two Cal students emerged shirtless from the stands at Memorial Stadium at the Big Game during halftime and tackled the tree, breaking branches and eliciting cheers from the Cal alumni prior to being handcuffed and led away. The most recent theft of the Tree was during the 2012 basketball game against Cal, when a member of the Cal Band entered LSJUMB's bus and removed the mascot. Older bandsmen quickly sent the Tree outfit back that evening and no charges were pressed.

Violence and absurd levels of prankery have been a two-way street between Cal and Stanford. A few years earlier, during an ESPN-televised timeout during a February 1995 basketball game at Maples Pavilion, the Stanford Tree and Cal's mascot Oski got into a fistfight in front of the Stanford student section. The Oski costume's headpiece was forcefully removed by the Tree during the scuffle, an act of special significance because Cal has taken great pains to keep its Oski costume wearers' identities secret since the 1940s.

A spate of recent troubles has brought the Tree even more notoriety in college sports circles. In February 2006, then-Tree Erin Lashnits was suspended until the end of her term as the Tree after her blood-alcohol level was found to be 0.157 (almost twice the legal driving limit in California) during a men's basketball game between Stanford and Cal. UC Berkeley police observed her drinking from a flask during the game and cited her for public drunkenness after she failed a breathalyzer test.
In August 2006, the NCAA fined Stanford University for what it termed "multiple violations of tournament policies" after an on-court altercation involving Tree mascot Tommy Leep and tournament officials as the Stanford women's basketball team participated in the second round of the NCAA Tournament in Denver.  The Tree was subsequently banned from the 2007 Women's Tournament.

The Tree was also featured in a few ESPN "This is SportsCenter" commercials. One example was when Atlanta Braves right fielder Jason Heyward was talking about how baseball bats were made when the Tree, in the background, fell over. Another example was when golfer Bubba Watson and his caddie were "playing through" the Tree, which was referred to as an obstacle.

In 2022, the 44th Stanford Tree, Jordan Zietz was suspended from his role for holding a sign reading "Stanford Hates Fun" with the Arizona State mascot. The "Stanford Hates Fun" sign was part of student backlash against the University's perceived curtailing of student activities, which some students have started calling a "War on Fun". The previous Tree, Grayson Armour, has stated that he would take over until Zietz returned.

List of Trees
1975-1977: Chris Hutson

1977-1978: Robert David Siegel

1978-1980: Meredith Fondahl

1980-1981: Judy Mischel

1981-1982: Eliza Pond

1982 football season: Annelies Kelly

1983-1984: Pat Leckman

1984-1985: Mardi Dier

1985-1986: Mary Boyce

1986-1987: Carole Sams Hoemeke

1987-1988: Paul Brendan Kelly III

1988-1989: William Washington Thomas III

1989-1990: Gil Blank

1990-1991: Todd David

1991-1992: Pete Huyck

1992-1993: Greg Siegel

1993-1994: Charles Goodan

1994-1995: Ari Benjamin Mervis

1995-1996: Christopher Jeffrey Bonzon

1996-1997: Christopher Anselmo Cary

1997-1998: Matthew James Merrill

1998-1999: Christopher Matthew Henderson

1999-2000: Evan Fletcher Meagher

2000-2001: Alexandra Mary Newell

2001-2002: Charles Monroe Armstrong

2002-2003: Andrew Daniel Parker

2003-2004: William Robert Rothacker, Jr.

2004-2005: Daniel Isaac Salier-Hellendag

2005-2006: Erin Wright Lashnits

2006-2007: Thomas Elwood Leep

2007-2008: John Henrique Whipple

2008-2009: Patrick Jonathan Fortune (Patchez)

2009-2010: Jonathan Patrick Strange (Shü-Fry)

2010-2011: Benjamin Cortes Fernando De La Guerra (Bollox)

2011-2012: Michael Benjamin Samuels

2012-2013: Nicoletta von Heidegger (Pacman)

2013-2014: Calvin Studebaker

2014-2015: William Funk

2015-2016: Sarah Young

2016-2017: Sam Weyen

2017-2018: Anaxi Mars

2018-2019: Dahkota Brown

2019-2020: Caroline Kushel

2020-2022: Grayson Armour

2022-2023: Jordan Grayson Zietz III

References 

Tree
Pac-12 Conference mascots